, also known as , is a near-Earth object and potentially hazardous asteroid of the Apollo group, approximately  in diameter. It was discovered on 17 May 2010 by the Wide-field Infrared Survey Explorer (WISE) satellite, but was lost until it was reobserved on 16 January 2016. With an observation arc over 11 years,  has a well-determined orbit and trajectory through the year 2086. The asteroid's orbit is only potentially hazardous on a time scale of thousands of years.

During closest approach,  reached a peak apparent magnitude of 14, visible to ground-based observers with telescope apertures of at least . It is the largest asteroid that approached within  of Earth in 2021.

References

External links 
 Goldstone Radar Observations Planning: 2016 AJ193 and 2011 UC292, Lance A. M. Benner, Jet Propulsion Laboratory
 Radar Reveals the Surface of Asteroid 2016 AJ193, Jet Propulsion Laboratory, 3 September 2021
 
 

Minor planet object articles (unnumbered)

20210821
20100517